Malcolm Mackinnon (11 May 1891 – 13 February 1975) was an English cricketer. He played for Essex between 1927 and 1935.

References

External links

1891 births
1975 deaths
English cricketers
Essex cricketers
Europeans cricketers